Social or general fraternities and sororities, in the North American fraternity system, are those that do not promote a particular profession (as professional fraternities are) or discipline (such as service fraternities and sororities). Instead, their primary purposes are often stated as the development of character, literary or leadership ability, or to serve a more simple social purpose. This list of social collegiate organizations; other types of social fraternal organizations can be found under List of general fraternities.

Some organizations in this list have a specific major listed as a traditional emphasis. These organizations are social organizations which cater to students in those majors. Other organizations listed have a traditional emphasis in a specific religion or ethnic background, such as Christian fraternities and sororities. Despite this emphasis, most organizations have non-discrimination membership policies.

Fraternity is usually understood to mean a social organization composed only of men, and sorority one of women, although many women's organizations and co-ed organizations also refer to themselves as fraternities. This list of collegiate North American fraternities and sororities is not exhaustive and does not attempt to include local organizations that do not have Wikipedia articles.

Fraternities 
Active chapter are indicated in bold. Inactive fraternities are indicated in italic.

Notes

Sororities and women's fraternities 
Inactive sororities are indicated in italic.

Notes

Coeducational fraternities 
Coeducational fraternities permit both male and female members. Inactive chapters are indicated in italic.

Notes

See also 

 Christian fraternity / Christian sorority
 Cultural interest fraternities and sororities
 Fraternities and sororities in Canada
 Fraternities and sororities in North America
 List of African-American Greek and fraternal organizations
 List of fraternities and sororities in France
 List of fraternities and sororities in the Philippines
 List of fraternities and sororities in Puerto Rico
 List of Jewish fraternities and sororities
 List of Latino Greek-letter organizations
 List of LGBT and LGBT-friendly fraternities and sororities
 Professional fraternities and sororities
 Service fraternities and sororities

References 

 
Social fraternities and sororities
Social fraternities and sororities
Social fraternities and sororities